E 009 is a European B class road in Tajikistan, connecting the cities Jirgatal – Khorugh – Ishkoshim – Lyanga – border of Afghanistan

Route 

 РБ07 Road: Vahdat (Jirgatol) -  Gharm (Rasht) - Labi Jar (E 60)
 РБ03 Road: Labi Jar - Qal'ai Khumb
 РБ04 Road: Qal'ai Khumb - Khorugh  (E 008)
 РБ06 Road: Khorugh - Ishkoshim - Langar - Border of Afghanistan

Wakhan Corridor: Theoretically, E009 will go from Border of Tajikistan, Dehqan Khana to the border of China. Such a road does not exist in reality

External links 
 UN Economic Commission for Europe: Overall Map of E-road Network (2007)

International E-road network
Roads in Tajikistan